John Bankhead may refer to:

John Bankhead (minister) (1738–1833), Irish Presbyterian minister
John P. Bankhead (1821–1867), officer in the United States Navy
 John H. Bankhead (1842–1920), U.S. senator
John H. Bankhead II (1872–1946), U.S. senator, son of John H. Bankhead

See also